Yordanis Borrero Lamouth (born January 3, 1978, in Havana, Ciudad de la Habana) is a male weightlifter from Cuba. He twice won a gold medal at the Pan American Games (2003 and 2007) for his native Caribbean country. Borrero represented Cuba at the 2008 Summer Olympics in Beijing, PR China and he won the bronze medal in the men's lightweight category (69 kg).

References

 sports-reference

1978 births
Living people
Cuban male weightlifters
Olympic weightlifters of Cuba
Weightlifters at the 2008 Summer Olympics
Weightlifters at the 2003 Pan American Games
Weightlifters at the 2007 Pan American Games
Sportspeople from Havana
Pan American Games gold medalists for Cuba
Pan American Games medalists in weightlifting
Central American and Caribbean Games gold medalists for Cuba
Competitors at the 2006 Central American and Caribbean Games
Central American and Caribbean Games medalists in weightlifting
Medalists at the 2007 Pan American Games
Olympic medalists in weightlifting
Olympic bronze medalists for Cuba
Medalists at the 2008 Summer Olympics
21st-century Cuban people